is a Japanese cartoonist and manga artist, best known for his work Captain Tsubasa. Takahashi has published  art books, manga, novels, and guides, most of which are about Captain Tsubasa. He is also known for his soccer series, Hungry Heart: Wild Striker.

Yoichi Takahashi visited FC Barcelona, Ozora Tsubasa's Spanish football club in the manga, on 17 January 2016 as a guest of the club.

In 2018. Takahashi received the Honorary Citizen Award from Katsushika for his contributions to the city through his manga.

Works
 Captain Tsubasa series
 Captain Tsubasa (1981–1988, in Weekly Shōnen Jump)
 Captain Tsubasa: All Star Game (one-shot)
 Captain Tsubasa: FCRB (one-shot)
 Captain Tsubasa: Final Countdown (one-shot)
 Captain Tsubasa: GOLDEN–23 (2005- current, Weekly Young Jump)
 Captain Tsubasa: Golden Dream (one-shot)
 Captain Tsubasa: I am Taro Misaki (one-shot)
 Captain Tsubasa: Japan Dream 2006 (one-shot)
 Captain Tsubasa: Millennium Dream (one-shot)
 Captain Tsubasa: ROAD TO 2002 (2001–2004, in Weekly Young Jump)
 Captain Tsubasa: ROAD TO 2002 - GO FOR 2006 (5 chapters, in Weekly Young Jump)
 Captain Tsubasa: Saikyo no teki: Holland Youth (one-shot)
 Captain Tsubasa: Tanpenshuu DREAM FIELD (one-shot)
 Captain Tsubasa: World Youth Saga (1994–1997, in Weekly Shōnen Jump)

 Other works
 100 M. Jumper
 Ace! (1990–1991, in Weekly Shōnen Jump)
 Chibi (1992–1993, in Weekly Shōnen Jump)
 Hungry Heart: Wild Striker (2002–2004, in Weekly Shōnen Champion)
 Sho no Densetsu
 Captain Tsubasa: 3109 Nichi Zenkiroku guide
 Goalkeeper novel
  Soccer Shoujo Kaede (one-shot)

References

External links

 Yoichi Takahashi manga at Media Arts Database 
 Ace! Vol.1 at S-Manga.Net 
 Captain Tsubasa GOLDEN-23 Vol.1 at S-Manga.Net 

1960 births
Living people
Manga artists from Tokyo
Captain Tsubasa